Larry Moore may refer to:
 Larry Moore (American football)
 Larry Moore (reporter)
 Larry Moore (basketball)